Lakewood Yacht Club is a yacht club located in Seabrook, Texas, and is a member of the Gulf Yachting Association. The club sits on 38 acres of land, housing six sheds and seven docks. Also included are over 250 covered slips, ranging in size from 44’ to 100’, for power boats; there are an additional 200+ open slips (40’–100’) on fixed and floating piers.

Lakewood Yacht Club has been recognized as one of the three most prestigious yacht clubs in the United States e.g., in the Robb Report, the New York Times, and the Christian Examiner . Its membership includes multiple Nobel Prize laureates, as well as more former Presidents, brain surgeons and astronauts than any other American yacht club.

References

1955 establishments in Texas
Galveston Bay Area
Greater Houston
Sailing in Texas
Sports venues in Harris County, Texas
Yacht clubs in the United States